The Drifters is a 1919 American silent drama film directed by Jesse D. Hampton and starring J. Warren Kerrigan, William Conklin and Lois Wilson.

Cast
 J. Warren Kerrigan as Burke Marston 
 William Conklin as Evan Mears 
 Casson Ferguson as Hugh MacLaren 
 Lois Wilson as The Girl 
 Walter Perry as Pat Gerry

References

Bibliography
 Darby, William. Masters of Lens and Light: A Checklist of Major Cinematographers and Their Feature Films. Scarecrow Press, 1991.

External links

1919 films
1919 drama films
Silent American drama films
Films directed by Jesse D. Hampton
American silent feature films
1910s English-language films
Pathé Exchange films
American black-and-white films
Films distributed by W. W. Hodkinson Corporation
1910s American films